Ganak is a division of Assamese Brahmins in Assam, India, who practise astrology and perform various Vedic rituals (Namakarana, Annaprashana etc ). Synonyms for the name of this group usage include Surya Vipra, Daivajna Brahmins, Daivgya Brahmins, Acharya and Graha Vipra.

They claim to be  descendants of Sakaldwipiya / Maga Brahmins. The common surnames used by this group are Sarma / Sarmah / Sharma, Changkakoti, Bordoloi, Borkakoty,  Bhagawati, Baruah, Majindar Baruah etc.

Gotras of Ganak Brahmins are — 
 Kashyap
 Garg
 Mihirian
 Basistha
 Kaushik
 Bharadwaj

References

Indian castes
Brahmin communities of Assam
Brahmin communities of Odisha
Brahmin communities by language